Sol is an administrative neighborhood of Madrid belonging to the district of Centro.

It has a total area of around 44.5 hectares (less than 0.1% out of the total municipal area). Hugely affected by the impact of tourism, by 2018 it had over 2 tourists per 1 permanent dweller.

References 

Wards of Madrid
Sol neighborhood, Madrid